Béatrice Pierre Hess (born 10 November 1961 in Colmar) is a French Paralympic swimmer. The French newspaper L'Humanité has described her as "one of the best swimmers in the world",

Competing at the Paralympic Games, Hess won four gold medals in 1984, one in 1988, six in 1996, and seven in 2000. She also broke nine world records at the 2000 Paralympics in Sydney. At the 2004 Games, she won two gold and three silver medals.

Hess has cerebral palsy, and competes in the S5 disability classification.

See also
Athletes with most gold medals in one event at the Paralympic Games

References

External links
 Biography on Who's Who in France
 

1961 births
Living people
Sportspeople from Colmar
French female backstroke swimmers
French female breaststroke swimmers
French female butterfly swimmers
French female freestyle swimmers
French female medley swimmers
Paralympic swimmers of France
Swimmers at the 1984 Summer Paralympics
Swimmers at the 1988 Summer Paralympics
Swimmers at the 1996 Summer Paralympics
Swimmers at the 2000 Summer Paralympics
Swimmers at the 2004 Summer Paralympics
Paralympic gold medalists for France
Paralympic silver medalists for France
World record holders in paralympic swimming
Medalists at the 1984 Summer Paralympics
Medalists at the 1988 Summer Paralympics
Medalists at the 1996 Summer Paralympics
Medalists at the 2000 Summer Paralympics
Medalists at the 2004 Summer Paralympics
Paralympic medalists in swimming
S5-classified Paralympic swimmers
20th-century French women